Shkëlqim Cani (born 6 May 1956) was Governor of the Bank of Albania, which is the Central Bank of Albania, from August 1997 to October 2004, when Ardian Fullani took over the position. He is also the Minister of Finance-designate in the Rama Government of Prime Minister-designate Edi Rama.

References

1956 births
Albanian economists
Governors of the Bank of Albania
Government ministers of Albania
Deputy Prime Ministers of Albania
Finance ministers of Albania
Living people
People from Tirana
Socialist Party of Albania politicians
University of Tirana alumni